Eoborus is a fossil genus of medium-sized air-breathing land snails, terrestrial pulmonate gastropods in the family Strophocheilidae. Eoborus is the oldest fossil record of Strophocheilidae, dating from the Middle Paleocene of Brazil (Itaboraí Basin) and Uruguay (Santa Lucía Basin). The Brazilian species, alongside Eoborus charruanus from Uruguay, are the oldest fossil record of the family.

The small size and large umbilicus of Eoborus are its most remarkable characteristics; it is considered primitive in the family Strophocheilidae.

Species 
Species within the genus Eoborus include:
 Eoborus berroi Klappenbach & Olazarri, 1986 - from Uruguay
 Eoborus charruanus (Frenguelli, 1930) - from Uruguay and Argentina - type species of genus
 Eoborus fusiforme Salvador & Simone, 2013 - from Brazil
 Eoborus rotundus Salvador & Simone, 2012 - from Brazil
 Eoborus sanctijosephi (Maury, 1935) - from Brazil
Some authors note that two other species, Strophocheilus chubutensis and Strophocheilus hauthali could also belong to Eoborus.

References 

Strophocheilidae
Paleocene gastropods
Eocene gastropods
Oligocene gastropods
Miocene gastropods